Thomas John Barras (born 21 June 1978) is an English former professional road racing cyclist, who took more than 100 race wins during his career. Barras is also the son of former professional racing cyclist, Sid Barras.

Career
Barras was born in Keighley, West Yorkshire. After graduating from Loughborough University in 2000, Barras started his professional career in Belgium, before returning to the UK in 2006. He combined his racing with work as a web designer from 2007. Barras was ranked 13th in the UK national road rankings at the end of the 2007 racing season. In December 2014 he was announced as a member of the  squad for 2015. Barras retired from racing at the end of the 2015 season, but remained with NFTO as a directeur sportif.

He now runs his own coaching company Training Pro.

Major results

2007
 1st Roger Martin Memorial Race
 1st Brighouse Town Centre Elite Criterium
 3rd Round 1, National Criterium Series, Crawley
 3rd Darley Moor Circuit Race
2008
 1st Overall Bermuda Grand Prix
1st Stages 1 & 2
2009
 1st Overall Bermuda Grand Prix
1st Stage 1
 1st Road race, Yorkshire Regional Road Championships
2011
 1st Hillingdon GP
2012
1st Stage 3 Holme Valley Wheelers 2-day
3rd Sheffrec CC Spring Road Race
2013
2nd York Cycleworks Elite Road Race
2014
1st Round 2, North East Spring Cup - Middlesbrough
2nd Round 5, Chevin Cycles Evening Road Race Series - Boroughbridge
2015
1st Ducan Sparrow Road Race

References

External links

1978 births
Living people
Cyclists from Yorkshire
Sportspeople from Keighley